Manolis or Emmanouil Paterakis was a member of the Cretan resistance during World War II, who lived in the village of Koustogerako in the then-province of Selino. In English language sources, he also appears as Manoli Paterakis.

Life

At the outbreak of World War II, Paterakis was a young gendarme on the island of Crete. After the Battle of Crete he evacuated to the Middle East, where he trained with the British Commandos in sabotage. He was returned to Crete, along with Georgios Tyrakis, as the permanent partners of Patrick Leigh Fermor and W. Stanley Moss on a mission to capture German general Heinrich Kreipe. They arrested the general and drove him to the mountains, continuing south to a bay codenamed "X75" near Rodakino, from which Kreipe was embarked on a submarine destined for Cairo.

As the war continued, the Germans murdered Paterakis's father and his two brothers. After the war, he found himself without work. Considerably later on, the Germans, ignorant of the part which he had played in taking Kreipe prisoner, brought him to work and appointed him a guard at the Maleme German military cemetery.

External links
 - Documentary from the archive of Hellenic Broadcasting Corporation (1985, in Greek)

References
 

Greek Resistance members
People from Chania (regional unit)
Cretan Resistance
Special Operations Executive personnel